was an  destroyer of the Imperial Japanese Navy. Her name means "Young   Moon".

Design and description
The Akizuki-class ships were originally designed as anti-aircraft escorts for carrier battle groups, but were modified with torpedo tubes and depth charges to meet the need for more general-purpose destroyer. Her crew numbered 300 officers and enlisted men.

The ship had two Kampon geared steam turbines, each driving one propeller shaft, using steam provided by three Kampon water-tube boilers.

The main armament of the Akizuki class consisted of eight Type 98  dual purpose guns in four twin-gun turrets, two superfiring pairs fore and aft of the superstructure. They carried four Type 96  anti-aircraft guns in two twin-gun mounts. The ships were also armed with four  torpedo tubes in a single quadruple traversing mount; one reload was carried for each tube. Their anti-submarine weapons comprised six depth charge throwers for which 72 depth charges were carried.

Construction and career

The ship was commissioned on 31 May 1943 into the 11th Destroyer Squadron. Both of these carriers participated in the attack on Pearl Harbor.

On 11 November 1944, Wakatsuki was escorting a troop convoy to Ormoc, Philippines. She was sunk by aircraft of Task Force 38 in Ormoc Bay, west of Leyte.

Rediscovery
Wakatsuki's wreck was discovered in early December 2017 by Microsoft co-founder Paul Allen's research vessel RV Petrel 869 ft (265 m) below the surface of Ormoc Bay. She was found to be heavily damaged from both her sinking and impact with the seafloor, resting on her starboard side.

Notes

References

External links
 CombinedFleet.com: Akizuki-class destroyers
 CombinedFleet.com: Wakatsuki history

Akizuki-class destroyers (1942)
World War II destroyers of Japan
Shipwrecks in the Sulu Sea
World War II shipwrecks in the Pacific Ocean
Destroyers sunk by aircraft
1942 ships
Maritime incidents in November 1944
Ships sunk by US aircraft
Shipwreck discoveries by Paul Allen